Serenomyces is a genus of fungi within the family Phaeochoraceae.

Species
As accepted by Species Fungorum;
Serenomyces mauritiae 
Serenomyces palmae  
Serenomyces phoenicis  
Serenomyces virginiae 

Former species;
 S.  californicus  = Cocoicola californica, Phaeochoraceae
 S. shearii  = Serenomyces mauritiae, Phaeochoraceae

References

External links 

Sordariomycetes genera
Phyllachorales